The Metro Railways (Construction of Works) Act, 1978 is an act of the Parliament of India that governs the construction of works relating to metro railways in metropolitan cities in the country. When it was enacted in 1978, the Act applied in the first instance to the metropolitan city of Calcutta (now Kolkata). The Act also empowered the Central Government to, by notification in The Gazette of India, extend the Act to any other metropolitan city. This provision has been utilized in subsequent years to extend the Act to other metro railway systems in the country.

Proposal and enactment
The Metro Railways (Construction of Works) Bill, 1978 (Bill No. 87 of 1978) was introduced in the Lok Sabha on 12 May 1978, and passed by that House on 26 July. The Bill was passed by the Rajya Sabha on 3 August 1978. The bill received assent from then President Neelam Sanjiva Reddy on 21 August 1978. The Act came into force on 1 February 1979.

Amendments

1982
The Metro Railways Act was amended in 1982. The amendment act is named The Metro Railways (Construction of Works) Amendment Act, 1982 (Act No. 41 of 1982). The Metro Railways (Construction of Works) Amendment, Bill, 1981 (Bill No. 165 of 1981) was introduced in the Lok Sabha on 22 December 1981, and passed by that House on the same day. It was passed by the Rajya Sabha on 7 August 1982. The Bill received assent from then President Zail Singh on 21 August 1982. It was notified in The Gazette of India on 6 May 1983, and came into force on 15 May 1983.

2009
The Act was amended for a second time in 2009. The amendment bill titled The Metro Railways (Amendment) Bill, 2009 (Bill No. 64-C of 2009) was passed by the Lok Sabha on 6 August 2009.

See also
 Metro Railway (Operations and Maintenance) Act, 2002
 Rapid transit in India

References

External links
 Metro Railways (Amendment) Bill, 2009 - Full text 

Acts of the Parliament of India 1978
Desai administration
History of rail transport in India
Railway legislation